Suzanne Henriette de Lorraine (1 February 1686 – 19 October 1710) was a member of the House of Lorraine and was the Duchess of Mantua by marriage. Her husband Ferdinand Charles Gonzaga was the last Gonzaga duke of Mantua.

Biography
Suzanne Henriette was the penultimate daughter of Charles de Lorraine, Duke of Elbeuf and his third wife Françoise de Montault de Navailles (1653-1717), daughter of Philippe de Montaut-Bénac, Duke de Navailles. Her two older half brothers, Henri and Emmanuel Maurice were successively dukes of Elbeuf and she was known as Mademoiselle d'Elbeuf.

Henri Jules, Prince de Condé (son of le Grand Condé) had proposed his daughter Marie Anne, Mademoiselle de Montmorency as a bride for Ferdinando Carlo Gonzaga, ruler of the Duchies of Mantua and Montferrat (known in France as Charles de Gonzague.), but that alliance was not realized. Ferdinando's first wife and cousin, Anna Isabella Gonzaga, died in August 1703, leaving him childless.

Although the Lorraine-Elbeufs were reckoned among the princes etrangers at the court of France, as a cadet branch of a non-reigning cadet branch (Guise) of the House of Lorraine, it was not their custom to marry crowned heads. Nevertheless, Ferdinando Carlo Gonzaga, Duke of Mantua and Montferrat sought Suzanne Henriette's hand in pursuit of a dynastic alliance with another reigning ducal house under French influence. Mlle. d'Elbeuf married the Duke in Milan, to which she had been conducted by her grandmother Catherine Henriette de Bourbon. 

He died on 5 July 1708, leaving Suzanne Henriette a widow at the age of 22.

Suzanne Henriette returned to France. Later she was involved in a lawsuit between Leopold, Duke of Lorraine and Anne of Bavaria, Princess de Condé, over inheritance of the Guise fortune. Residing in Paris, she died there in 1710 at the age of 24. She was buried at the Carmel du faubourg Saint-Germain in the crypt of her grandfather, the Maréchal de Navailles. Saint-Simon observed that she died in the flower of her youth after a long illness, also noting that, having been considered a beauty, her "bizarre" marriage had been the cause of a sad life.

Ancestry

References and notes

1686 births
1710 deaths
House of Guise
House of Gonzaga
Princesses of Lorraine
Nobility from Paris
17th-century French nobility
18th-century French nobility
Duchesses of Montferrat
Duchesses of Mantua